David Dryer is an American visual effects artist. He was nominated for an Academy Award in the category Best Visual Effects for the film Blade Runner.

Selected filmography 
 Blade Runner (1982; co-nominated with Douglas Trumbull and Richard Yuricich)

References

External links 

Living people
Place of birth missing (living people)
Year of birth missing (living people)
Visual effects artists
Visual effects supervisors